The Albanian Volleyball Federation (FSHV) is the head governing body for the sport of professional volleyball in Albania. It organises the first division, second division leagues and a cup competition.

History

The Albanian Volleyball Federation was found on 2 September 1945. In September 1949, the FSHV became a full-fledged member of the Fédération Internationale de Volleyball (FIVB) and a member of the European Volleyball Confederation (CEV). Since October 2000 he is a member of the Balkan Volleyball Association (BVA).

See also 
 Sports in Albania

References

External links
 

Albania
Volleyball
Volleyball in Albania